Ilse Vaessen (born 15 April 1986) is a Dutch badminton player. Her international career has been hindered by a severe knee injury. She now is the manager of the "topbadminton" department of the Dutch Badminton Association "Badminton Nederland". She still plays at the highest level club team competition in doubles for her club BV Almere in the Dutch Eredivisie (Premier Division).

Achievements

BWF International Challenge/Series
Women's doubles

Mixed doubles

 BWF International Challenge tournament
 BWF International Series tournament
 BWF Future Series tournament

References

External links
 

1986 births
Living people
Sportspeople from Arnhem
Dutch female badminton players
21st-century Dutch women